Paolo Cesar Yurivilca Calderón (born 23 April 1996) is a race walker from Peru.  He is from San Agustín de Cajas, Huancayo province. He placed 3rd in the 10km race walk at the World Junior Athletics Championship and 41st in the 20 km race walk event at the 2016 Summer Olympics.

He is currently a Medical student at the Facultad de Medicina UNCP at the Universidad Nacional del Centro del Perú.

References

1996 births
Living people
Peruvian male racewalkers
Olympic athletes of Peru
Athletes (track and field) at the 2016 Summer Olympics